The 2012 WNBA season is the 16th season for the New York Liberty of the Women's National Basketball Association. The Liberty played at Prudential Center in New Jersey from 2011 through 2013 during renovations at Madison Square Garden.

Transactions

WNBA Draft
The following are the Liberty's selections in the 2012 WNBA Draft.

Transaction log
April 11, 2011: The Liberty traded a second-round pick in the 2012 Draft to the Minnesota Lynx in exchange for Jessica Breland.
May 27, 2011: The Liberty swapped third-round picks in the 2012 Draft with the Minnesota Lynx as part of the Quanitra Hollingsworth trade.
February 14: The Liberty re-signed Leilani Mitchell.
February 24: The Liberty signed Kelly Miller.
March 5: The Liberty signed Rafaella Masciadri.
April 13: The Liberty signed DeMya Walker and Essence Carson.
April 23: The Liberty signed Laura Broomfield and Iasia Hemingway.
April 27: The Liberty signed draft picks Kelley Cain and Katelan Redmon.
May 11: The Liberty waived Iasia Hemingway.
May 16: The Liberty waived Laura Broomfield and Sydney Colson.
May 17: The Liberty waived Katelan Redmon and Raffaella Masciadri and suspended Quanitra Hollingsworth.
July 2: The Liberty waived Kelly Miller.

Personnel changes

Additions

Subtractions

Roster

Depth

Season standings

Schedule

Preseason

|- align="center" bgcolor="ffbbbb"
| 1 || Mon 7 || 7:00 || @ Connecticut ||  || 81-96 || Braxton (18) || Braxton (11) || Mitchell (5) || Mohegan Sun Arena  4,287 || 0-1
|- align="center" bgcolor="ffbbbb"
| 2 || Mon 14 || 10:30am || Chicago ||  || 57-89 || Pierson (14) || Carson (6) || Mitchell (4) || Prudential Center  6,397 || 0-2
|-

Regular season

|- align="center" bgcolor="ffbbbb"
| 1 || Sat 19 || 4:00 || Connecticut || MSG+ || 73-78 || Pondexter (19) || Pierson (10) || Mitchell (3) || Madison Square Garden  8,112 || 0-1
|- align="center" bgcolor="ffbbbb"
| 2 || Sun 20 || 5:00 || @ Connecticut || CPTV-S || 77-92 || Pondexter (18) || Pierson (5) || MitchellPondexter (4) || Mohegan Sun Arena  7,118 || 0-2
|- align="center" bgcolor="ffbbbb"
| 3 || Tue 22 || 7:00 || Minnesota ||  || 62-80 || Pondexter (15) || Vaughn (11) || Mitchell (2) || Prudential Center  5,411 || 0-3
|- align="center" bgcolor="ffbbbb"
| 4 || Fri 25 || 7:30 || @ Atlanta || SSO || 74-100 || Pondexter (18) || Pierson (10) || MitchellPondexter (5) || Philips Arena  6,802 || 0-4
|-

|- align="center" bgcolor="ffbbbb"
| 5 || Sat 2 || 7:00 || @ Indiana || FS-I || 68-91 || Pierson (24) || Powell (7) || PondexterWalker (4) || Bankers Life Fieldhouse  8,006 || 0-5
|- align="center" bgcolor="bbffbb"
| 6 || Sun 3 || 6:00 || Indiana || MSG || 87-72 || Pondexter (25) || Vaughn (8) || CarsonPierson (4) || Prudential Center  4,905 || 1-5
|- align="center" bgcolor="bbffbb"
| 7 || Tue 5 || 7:00 || Atlanta ||  || 79-74 || Pondexter (26) || Vaughn (8) || Mitchell (4) || Prudential Center  4,823 || 2-5
|- align="center" bgcolor="bbffbb"
| 8 || Fri 8 || 7:00 || @ Washington || CSN-MA || 76-70 || Pondexter (25) || Walker (6) || Carson (5) || Verizon Center  9,108 || 3-5
|- align="center" bgcolor="ffbbbb"
| 9 || Sun 10 || 4:00 || Chicago || MSGCN100 || 64-73 || Pondexter (22) || CarsonPondexterVaughn (6) || Pondexter (7) || Prudential Center  5,908 || 3-6
|- align="center" bgcolor="ffbbbb"
| 10 || Fri 15 || 7:00 || @ Connecticut ||  || 55-97 || Carson (14) || PondexterWalker (5) || PondexterVaughn (4) || Mohegan Sun Arena  6,522 || 3-7
|- align="center" bgcolor="bbffbb"
| 11 || Tue 19 || 7:00 || @ Atlanta || FS-S || 73-60 || CarsonPondexter (14) || Pondexter (6) || Pondexter (13) || Philips Arena  4,134 || 4-7
|- align="center" bgcolor="ffbbbb"
| 12 || Thu 21 || 8:00 || @ Minnesota ||  || 70-102 || Pondexter (30) || 4 players (5) || Pondexter (5) || Target Center  9,050 || 4-8
|- align="center" bgcolor="ffbbbb"
| 13 || Sun 24 || 4:00 || Atlanta || MSG || 64-74 || Mitchell (16) || Braxton (13) || Pondexter (5) || Prudential Center  6,754 || 4-9
|- align="center" bgcolor="bbffbb"
| 14 || Sat 30 || 4:00 || Seattle || NBATV || 77-59 || Carson (22) || Pondexter (7) || Pondexter (4) || Prudential Center  6,724 || 5-9
|-

|- align="center" bgcolor="bbffbb"
| 15 || Fri 6 || 8:30 || @ Chicago || CN100 || 64-59 || Pondexter (19) || Carson (11) || Mitchell (4) || Allstate Arena  4,211 || 6-9
|- align="center" bgcolor="ffbbbb"
| 16 || Sun 8 || 4:00 || San Antonio || NBATVMSG || 81-94 || Carson (25) || BraxtonPondexter (8) || Mitchell (6) || Prudential Center  7,714 || 6-10
|- align="center" bgcolor="ffbbbb"
| 17 || Tue 10 || 12:00 || @ Indiana ||  || 82-84 || Pondexter (33) || CainPowell (6) || Pondexter (5) || Bankers Life Fieldhouse  9,216 || 6-11
|- align="center" bgcolor="ffbbbb"
| 18 || Fri 13 || 11:00am || Washington ||  || 53-70 || Pondexter (22) || CarsonPowell (8) || Pondexter (3) || Prudential Center  14,715 || 6-12
|-
| colspan="11" align="center" valign="middle" | Summer Olympic break
|-

|-
| colspan="11" align="center" valign="middle" | Summer Olympic break
|- align="center" bgcolor="bbffbb"
| 19 || Thu 16 || 7:00 || Connecticut || NBATVMSG || 79-66 || Pondexter (24) || Vaughn (7) || Pondexter (5) || Prudential Center  5,865 || 7-12
|- align="center" bgcolor="ffbbbb"
| 20 || Sat 18 || 7:00 || @ Connecticut || CPTV-S || 74-85 || CarsonPondexter (17) || Pierson (8) || Pondexter (5) || Mohegan Sun Arena  8,232 || 7-13
|- align="center" bgcolor="bbffbb"
| 21 || Tue 21 || 8:00 || @ Chicago || CN100 || 77-67 || Pondexter (25) || Braxton (7) || Mitchell (6) || Allstate Arena  3,638 || 8-13
|- align="center" bgcolor="bbffbb"
| 22 || Thu 23 || 10:00 || @ Phoenix ||  || 89-77 || Pondexter (31) || Braxton (9) || Mitchell (7) || US Airways Center  7,039 || 9-13
|- align="center" bgcolor="ffbbbb"
| 23 || Sat 25 || 10:30 || @ Los Angeles || NBATVTWC101 || 62-87 || Pondexter (20) || Pierson (10) || Mitchell (6) || Staples Center  12,433 || 9-14
|- align="center" bgcolor="ffbbbb"
| 24 || Sun 26 || 9:00 || @ Seattle ||  || 66-84 || Pondexter (23) || Pierson (6) || Pierson (4) || KeyArena  6,459 || 9-15
|- align="center" bgcolor="ffbbbb"
| 25 || Thu 30 || 7:00 || Indiana || NBATVMSG || 63-76 || CarsonPondexter (18) || PiersonPondexter (8) || Pierson (4) || Prudential Center  5,315 || 9-16
|-

|- align="center" bgcolor="bbffbb"
| 26 || Sat 1 || 4:00 || Washington || NBATVMSG || 79-73 || Carson (20) || Pondexter (6) || Carson (6) || Prudential Center  6,245 || 10-16
|- align="center" bgcolor="bbffbb"
| 27 || Wed 5 || 7:00 || Phoenix || MSG || 87-59 || Pierson (17) || Cain (6) || Pondexter (8) || Prudential Center  4,732 || 11-16
|- align="center" bgcolor="ffbbbb"
| 28 || Fri 7 || 7:30 || Chicago || MSGCN100 || 83-92 || Pondexter (24) || Braxton (11) || Pondexter (4) || Prudential Center  6,145 || 11-17
|- align="center" bgcolor="bbffbb"
| 29 || Sun 9 || 4:00 || Los Angeles || NBATVMSGKDOC || 73-71 || Pondexter (21) || Pondexter (12) || Pondexter (8) || Prudential Center  7,357 || 12-17
|- align="center" bgcolor="bbffbb"
| 30 || Wed 12 || 7:00 || Washington || MSG || 75-62 || Pondexter (22) || Vaughn (10) || Pondexter (6) || Prudential Center  5,717 || 13-17
|- align="center" bgcolor="bbffbb"
| 31 || Sun 16 || 4:00 || @ Washington || NBATV || 75-68 || Pondexter (30) || Pondexter (11) || Pondexter (5) || Verizon Center  8,087 || 14-17
|- align="center" bgcolor="ffbbbb"
| 32 || Tue 18 || 8:00 || @ San Antonio || ESPN2 || 66-77 || Pondexter (23) || Pierson (6) || PiersonPondexter (3) || AT&T Center  6,650 || 14-18
|- align="center" bgcolor="ffbbbb"
| 33 || Thu 20 || 8:00 || @ Tulsa ||  || 66-78 || BraxtonPiersonPondexter (14) || Vaughn (7) || Pondexter (5) || BOK Center  5,661 || 14-19
|- align="center" bgcolor="bbffbb"
| 34 || Sat 22 || 2:00 || Tulsa || NBATVMSG || 91-74 || Pierson (19) || Vaughn (9) || PiersonPondexter (5) || Prudential Center  8,508 || 15-19
|-

| All games are viewable on WNBA LiveAccess or ESPN3.com

Postseason

|- align="center" bgcolor="ffbbbb"
| 1 || September 27 || 8:00 || @ Connecticut || ESPN2 || 60-65 || Pondexter (14) || Pierson (9) || Pondexter (6) || Mohegan Sun Arena  5,520 || 0-1
|- align="center" bgcolor="ffbbbb"
| 2 || September 29 || 7:00 || Connecticut || NBATV || 62-75 || Pondexter (20) || Vaughn (9) || Pierson (5) || Prudential Center  7,854 || 0-2
|-

Statistics

Regular season

Awards and honors

References

External links

New York Liberty seasons
New York
New York Liberty
2012 in sports in New Jersey